The 2012 Mississippi State Bulldogs football team represented Mississippi State University in the 2012 NCAA Division I FBS football season. The team was coached by Dan Mullen, who was in his fourth season with Mississippi State. The Bulldogs played their home games at Davis Wade Stadium in Starkville, Mississippi, and competed in the Western Division of the Southeastern Conference (SEC).

Schedule

Schedule Source:

Rankings

References

Mississippi State
Mississippi State Bulldogs football seasons
Mississippi State Bulldogs football